Christiaan Willem Anton Timmermans (born 6 December 1941 in Rotterdam) is a Dutch law professor and judge. He has been a judge at the European Court of Justice.

Early life and career
Timmermans was born in 1941 in Rotterdam.

Career
Timmermans pursued a career as law clerk in the European Court of Justice, working there between 1966 and 1969. He then worked as an official for the Commission of the European Communities between 1969 and 1977. In 1973 he obtained a Ph.D. in Law Studies at Leiden University. He subsequently worked as a professor of European Law at the University of Groningen between 1977 and 1989. Between 1989 and 2000 he was deputy director-general of the Legal Service at the European Commission. In 1991 Timmermans was made foreign correspondent of the Royal Netherlands Academy of Arts and Sciences.

In 2000 Timmermans was appointed as a judge of the European Court of Justice. He succeeded Paul Joan George Kapteyn as the Dutch judge, he himself was succeeded by Sacha Prechal in June 2010.

After his return to the Netherlands, Timmermans served as professor at the Law faculty (Pieter Sanders professorship) at the Erasmus University Rotterdam. From 2016 until 2019, he also served on the Commission's Independent Ethical Committee.

Other activities
 British Institute of International and Comparative Law, Member of the Advisory Council
 T.M.C. Asser Instituut, Member of the Advisory Council on International Law
 European Law Institute, Member of the Projects Committee
 Royal Netherlands Academy of Arts and Sciences, Foreign Correspondent
 European Anti-Fraud Office (OLAF), Member of the Supervisory Committee (2012-2015)

References

1941 births
Living people
Lawyers from Rotterdam
21st-century Dutch judges
Dutch legal scholars
Leiden University alumni
Academic staff of the University of Groningen
Academic staff of Erasmus University Rotterdam
Members of the Royal Netherlands Academy of Arts and Sciences
European Court of Justice judges
Dutch judges of international courts and tribunals